Soccer in the Australian state of Victoria is organised by Football Victoria (FV).  FV is a member of the national Football Australia.

National representation
Many clubs represented Victoria in the now defunct National Soccer League (NSL), three of which, South Melbourne FC, Melbourne Knights and Brunswick Juventus became champions. Along with South Melbourne, Heidelberg United, Footscray JUST and Mooroolbark United were NSL foundation clubs. At various times the following Victorian sides also competed in the NSL: Preston Lions FC; Carlton SC; Gippsland Falcons (also known as Eastern Pride); Collingwood Warriors; Sunshine George Cross; and Green Gully.

Victoria is currently represented in the top-flight A-League Men by Melbourne Victory, Melbourne City and Western United. Victory and City also have associated teams in the A-League Women and A-League Youth.

League and Cup systems

Leagues
The highest state based league is the National Premier Leagues Victoria, which forms a division of the National Premier Leagues.  The winner of which enters a national play-off series against the winners of other NPL divisions. The league below that is the National Premier Leagues Victoria 2 and National Premier Leagues Victoria 3. Below that, State Leagues 1 and 2 are split into North/West and South/East divisions. Below that, three divisions of the Provisional Leagues follow, also split into North/West and South/East divisions. The participating clubs are almost entirely located within metropolitan Melbourne, however there are separate regional leagues organised by associations subsidiary to the FFV, such as the Geelong Regional Football Association, Ballarat & District Soccer Association and the Gippsland Soccer League.

Cup
The Dockerty Cup, a knockout cup competition for Victorian clubs, ran every year from 1909 until 1996, with the exception of the years 1916–18 owing to World War I. Since then it has been in recess, except for season 2004.

The idea of a Victorian Cup competition was revived in 2011 with the Mirabella Cup, which was to feature all Victorian clubs, from the A-League through to the regional leagues, however the FFA later pulled Melbourne Victory and Melbourne Heart from the competition.  In 2012 and 2013 the competition was known as the FFV State Knockout Cup.  In 2014 the competition returned to the traditional Dockerty Cup title. Since 2014 the Dockerty Cup has been used to qualify Victorian clubs, with the exception of A-League clubs which already automatically qualify, for the national FFA Cup.

Honours
Honours since reorganization with NPL in 2014.

Most successful clubs overall

See also
 Football Victoria

References

External links

Football Victoria Official Website
Images of VPL fans
Official Melbourne Heart Website
Official Melbourne Victory Website

 
Vic
Football in Victoria (Australia)